Tospitis nulliferana is a moth in the subfamily Arctiinae. It was described by Francis Walker in 1863. It is found on Borneo. The habitat consists of coastal swamp forests and alluvial forests.

References

Moths described in 1863
Lithosiini